Antonio Infimo (born February 12, 1990) is an Italian professional football player currently playing for Lega Pro Seconda Divisione team F.C. Igea Virtus Barcellona on loan from A.S. Bari.

External links
 

1990 births
Living people
Italian footballers
Serie B players
S.S.C. Bari players
Association football forwards